Irani Barbosa (Belo Horizonte, 22 September 1950 – Belo Horizonte, 23 December 2020) was a Brazilian politician who served as a Deputy from 1991-1995. He died from COVID-19 during the COVID-19 pandemic in Brazil.

References

1950 births
2020 deaths
Brazilian politicians
Deaths from the COVID-19 pandemic in Minas Gerais